Andrew York may refer to:

 Andrew York, (born 1930), one of many pseudonyms of British writer Christopher Robin Nicole
 Andrew York (guitarist) (born 1958), American classical guitarist and composer
 Andy York (1894–1977), English footballer

See also
 Andy Yorke, musician
 Prince Andrew, Duke of York